Narus may refer to:
 Narus, South Sudan, a Payam in Eastern Equatoria State of South Sudan
 Narus River, Kapoeta, a river in Kapoeta East County of South Sudan
 Narus River, Uganda, a river in the north of Uganda 
 Narus Inc., a vendor of big data analytics for cybersecurity